San Juan, Puerto Rico, held an election for mayor on November 2, 1976. It was held as part of the 1976 Puerto Rican general election. It saw the election of Hernán Padilla, a member of the New Progressive Party.

Incumbent mayor Carlos Romero Barceló, a member of the New Progressive Party, did not seek reelection, and instead ran for governor.

Nominees
José Enrique Arrarás (Popular Democratic Party), secretary of the Housing Department
Hernán Padilla (New Progressive Party), member of the Puerto Rico House of Representatives
Lucía A. Romero (Puerto Rican Socialist Party)
Florencio Merced Rosa (Puerto Rican Independence Party)

Results

References

1976
San Juan, Puerto Rico mayoral
San Juan, Puerto Rico